Eupithecia olivacea is a moth in the family Geometridae first described by Taylor in 1906. It is found in North America from British Columbia south through Washington and Oregon to California.

The forewings are uniform olive brown. Adults are on wing from early March to April.

The larvae feed on Abies grandis, Abies amabilis, Abies lasiocarpa, Crataegus douglasii, Pseudotsuga menziesii var. glauca, Picea sitchensis and Tsuga heterophylla. They have a brown body and head and reach a length of about 20 mm when full grown. There are two morphs. Larvae can be found from April to June and pupation occurs from late June to July. The species overwinters in the pupal stage.

References

Moths described in 1906
olivacea
Moths of North America